Joseph Henry Bufford (c. 1854 - July 16, 1923) was a state legislator in Mississippi.

He was born in Marshall County, Mississippi. He lived in Rosedale, Mississippi and represented Bolivar County, Mississippi in the Mississippi House of Representatives from 1880 to 1882.

See also
African-American officeholders during and following the Reconstruction era

References

Year of birth uncertain
1850s births
1923 deaths
African-American politicians during the Reconstruction Era
People from Rosedale, Mississippi
People from Marshall County, Mississippi
Members of the Mississippi House of Representatives
African-American state legislators in Mississippi